Natalia Proskurina is a Russian sprint canoer who has competed since the late 2000s. At the 2010 ICF Canoe Sprint World Championships in Poznań, she won a bronze medal in the K-1 4 x 200 m event.

References
Les-sports.info profile. 

Living people
Russian female canoeists
Year of birth missing (living people)
ICF Canoe Sprint World Championships medalists in kayak